Asa Kasher (born June 6, 1940) is an Israeli philosopher and linguist working as a Professor at Tel Aviv University.

Biography
Asa Kasher is the grandson of talmudist Menachem Mendel Kasher. He is noted for authorship of Israel Defense Forces's Code of Conduct, as well as his co-authorship of an amended version of the controversial Hannibal Directive in the 1990s.

Kasher has also written an influential defense of Israel's 'law of return', justifying it as a form of affirmative action, following periods in which Jews were not allowed to immigrate to many countries.

He also wrote about possible meanings to a Jewish and democratic state, the meaning of a Jewish collective and many other essays.  His essays on Jewish subjects are collected in a book titled Ruach Ish (Spirit of a Man), published in Hebrew by Am Oved publication house. He is also the editor-in-chief of the philosophy journal Philosophia.  Kasher has contributed as well to the fields of psychology and ethics.

Awards and recognition
In 2000, Kasher was awarded the Israel Prize for philosophy.

Criticism
Uri Avnery criticised Kasher for arguing in favour of targeted killing by the IDF, in those cases in which it knowingly fires on targets where civilians are present or nearby if enemy forces are also known to be present, and that "it is justified to kill a Palestinian child who is in the company of a hundred 'terrorists'" because the terrorists might kill children.

Kasher was also criticized in his role as Editor-in-Chief of the philosophy journal Philosophia, which published and later retracted an article by Kevin MacDonald, titled “The ‘Default Hypothesis’ Fails to Explain Jewish Influence”.  The article was criticized as promoting anti-semitic tropes, and questions were raised about the peer review process for the paper, particularly after one of the paper's referees announced himself on twitter and he appeared to lack the requisite qualifications to referee papers for the journal. Springer Publishing undertook an investigation and retracted the paper.  Kasher eventually resigned as editor of Philosophia.

See also
List of Israel Prize recipients

References

External links
Asa Kasher's Homepage at TAU

Hebrew University of Jerusalem alumni
Living people
Israeli Jews
Academic staff of Tel Aviv University
Israel Prize in philosophy recipients
1940 births
Members of the European Academy of Sciences and Arts
Israeli ethicists